Lawrence Cheng Tan-shui (born 28 December 1954) is a Hong Kong film actor, director, screenwriter, producer, and master of ceremonies. He was a Hong Kong DJ and radio channel executive.

Cheng became famous after he created the radio drama series The Yuppie Fantasia (小男人週記) in 1986 which he also starred in. In 1989, he starred in the film adaptation of the series which was directed by Gordon Chan and became a box office hit.

Early life
Cheng was born in Hong Kong on 27 November 1954. His ancestral hometown is huizhou ( 惠州市), Guangdong province. Having attended secondary school in St. Paul's College, he went to the Baptist College, the top broadcasting school in Hong Kong, and graduated in 1978.

Acting career
Lawrence Cheng brought his comical slightly nerdish and slightly fantasia film persona into films since the mid-80s. He has acted in mainly comedy films over the next ten years and a few drama films. He occasionally wore more than one hat like other Hong Kong actors.

After graduating from the Baptist College in 1978, Cheng immediately joined RTV in which he worked on numerous popular television series. He later joined ATV and became a Creative Director. His career path changed from a TV personal to a radio producer and DJ in 1984 when he joined RTHK. In 1987, he made his return to television industry and joined TVB. In TVB, he was a variety show host, and acted in many dramas.

His film career started in 1980, however he was not yet well known til he starred in The Yuppie Fantasia in 1989, which was a box office hit grossing out US$2 million. Aside from being an actor, he is also a director, producer and screenwriter.

Cheng currently hosts variety shows as a freelancer for TVB, ATV, now TV Hong Kong Channel, feature Race Meetings and Events for The Hong Kong Jockey Club and acts in a few dramas. He acts as supporting actor in Hong Kong films.

In January 2011, he suffered a burst lung whilst playing football.

Filmography

Films

TVB dramas

Shaw Brother dramas

See also
 Cinema of Hong Kong

References

External links
 
 Hong Kong Cinemagic: Lawrence Cheng Tan Shui
 

1954 births
Hong Kong male film actors
Hong Kong film directors
Hong Kong film producers
Hong Kong screenwriters
Living people
Hong Kong male television actors
20th-century Hong Kong male actors
21st-century Hong Kong male actors
Alumni of Hong Kong Baptist University